Albert Harvey (23 July 1843 – 24 December 1912) was a Scottish rugby union player, and later a textile merchant. He was a founder of the Scottish Rugby Union and its second President.

Rugby Union career

Amateur career
Harvey played for Glasgow Academicals from the 1869-70 season.

In 1870, he was part of the Glasgow Academicals side which went to England to play Liverpool and Manchester.

Administrative career
Harvey and the Glasgow Academicals captain, John Arthur, were on the committee that formed the Scottish Rugby Union in 1873, which was originally known as the Scottish Football Union. He was President of the SRU from 1874-75.

Textile career
Harvey had a career in textiles and was in the Incorporation of Weavers in Glasgow. He was a Director of the Borneo Company in London and the Northern Assurance Company in Glasgow.

Days before his death on 24 December 1912 he was named as a Trustee in the West of Scotland American Investment Company. It was seeking more debenture capital from the public in an advert in The Scotsman newspaper.

Death
Harvey died suddenly while playing golf at Prestwick on 24 December 1912. The value of his estate was a sizeable £27251, 2 shillings and 2d.

Outside of rugby
Harvey remained closely connected with The Glasgow Academy. He was a judge at their Sports day in 1870. He was a Steward at their Sports Day in 1888. Attending the Academy was a family tradition among his sons and nephews.

He was also an enthusiastic sportsman. Harvey golfed and fished.

References

1843 births
1912 deaths
Glasgow Academicals rugby union players
Presidents of the Scottish Rugby Union
Rugby union players from Renfrew
Scottish rugby union players
Rugby union forwards